The Khazars were a semi-nomadic people who created an empire between the late 7th and 10th centuries. 

Khazar or Kazar may also refer to:

Kazár, Hungarian village
Ka-Zar (disambiguation), Marvel Comics characters
Kazar (film), a 2009 Konkani-language film
Ka-Zar (magazine), an earlier pulp magazine
Khazar language, an extinct Turkic language
Khazar University, in Baku
Villages in Khuzestan Province, Iran
Khazar-e Do
Khazar-e Seh
Khazar-e Yek
Xəzər, a village in Azerbaijan also romanized Khazar

See also
Hazaras